is a village located in Fukushima Prefecture, Japan. , the village had an estimated population of 6,497 in 2143 households, and a population density of 140 per km².

Geography
Tamakawa is located in south-central Fukushima prefecture at an average altitude of 262 meters. 
Mountains: Kannondake
Rivers: Abukuma River

Climate
Tamakawa has a humid climate (Köppen climate classification Cfa).

Neighboring municipalities
 Fukushima Prefecture
 Sukagawa
 Ishikawa
 Hirata
 Yabuki
 Kagamiishi

Demographics
According to Japanese census data, the population of Tamakawa has remained relatively stable since 1970.

History
The area of present-day Tamakawa was part of ancient Mutsu Province. The area was mostly tenryō territory under the direct control of the Tokugawa shogunate during the Edo period. After the Meiji Restoration, it was organized as part of Ishikawa District in the Nakadōri region of Iwashiro Province. The villages of Izumi and Sugama were established with the creation of the modern municipalities system on April 1, 1889. Tamagawa Village was formed on March 31, 1955 by the merger of the two villages.

Economy
Tamakawa has a mixed economy of agriculture and light/precision manufacturing.

Education
Tamakawa has two public elementary schools and two public junior high schools operated by the village government. The village does not have a high school.
 Tamakawa First Elementary School
 Tamakawa Sugama Elementary School
 Tamakawa Izumi Middle School
 Tamakawa Sugama Middle School

Transportation

Airports
Fukushima Airport

Railway
 JR East – Suigun Line
 –

Highway

International relations
 – Lugu, Nantou, Taiwan, Republic of China

Local attractions
Sugama Tōfuku-ji Stone Reliquary,  National Historic Site

References

External links

 

 
Villages in Fukushima Prefecture